William Black (5 September 1882 – 7 February 1960) was a Scottish footballer who played for Queen's Park, Celtic (winning the Scottish Football League title in his sole season with the club, 1904–05, but suffering a bad injury), Everton Dumbarton, Kilmarnock, Hamilton Academical and Airdrieonians. He was born on the Isle of Mull but spent most of his life living in Motherwell.

Notes and references

1882 births
1960 deaths
Scottish footballers
People from the Isle of Mull
Footballers from Motherwell
Queen's Park F.C. players
Celtic F.C. players
Everton F.C. players
Dumbarton F.C. players
Airdrieonians F.C. (1878) players
Scottish Football League players
Scottish Junior Football Association players
Scotland junior international footballers
Dalziel Rovers F.C. players
English Football League players
Kilmarnock F.C. players
Hamilton Academical F.C. players
Association football wing halves